Strip Down, Rise Up is a 2021 American documentary film made for Netflix and directed by Michèle Ohayon. It's story follows a group of women from a variety of ages and backgrounds who engage in pole dancing to heal trauma and body image shame. The film was released on February 5, 2021.

References

External links 
 

2021 films
2021 documentary films
American documentary films
2020s English-language films
Films directed by Michèle Ohayon
2020s American films